Rubicon is the eponymous debut album from the late-1970s funk rock band Rubicon (formed by Jerry Martini from Sly & the Family Stone and featuring future Night Ranger members Jack Blades on bass and Brad Gillis on guitars).  Released on 20th Century Fox in 1978, it featured the band's one and only hit single (leading them to be categorized as a one-hit wonder), the Max Haskett-penned "I'm Gonna Take Care of Everything" (highest Billboard peak: 28 in 1978).

In 2009, it was reissued as part of a combo pack with their next (and final) album, America Dreams by Renaissance Records.

Track listing
All songs arranged by Rubicon & published by Fox Fanfare Music, Inc./Nocibur Music-BMI.
"And the Moon's Out Tonight" (Gerald Martini) 3:28
"Far Away" (Max Haskett) 4:59
"Closely" (Dennis Marcellino) 5:30
"Vanilla Gorilla" (Martini, Haskett) 5:06
"I'm Gonna Take Care of Everything" (Haskett) 3:38
"I Want to Love You" (Jack Blades) 3:11
"Cheatin'" (Gregory Eckler, James Pugh) 3:46
"It's All for the Show" (Eckler) 3:50
"That's the Way Things Are" (Martini, Lynn Medeiros) 5:41

Personnel
Max Haskett - lead vocals, trumpet
Dennis Marcellino - saxophone, lead vocal, acoustic guitar
Jerry Martini - saxophone
Brad Gillis - lead, rhythm guitar
Jim Pugh - keyboards
Jack Blades - bass
Gregory Eckler - drums, percussion, lead vocals

Production
Produced by Richard Polodor
Recorded, engineered & mixed by Bill Cooper

External links
[ "Rubicon/American (sic) Dreams" at allmusic] Retrieved September 24, 2010.
"Rubicon" at discogs Retrieved September 24, 2010.

1978 debut albums
Albums produced by Richard Podolor
Funk rock albums by American artists
20th Century Fox Records albums